A number of major airlines have declared bankruptcy and have either ceased operations, or reorganized under bankruptcy protection. Airlines, like any business, are susceptible to market fluctuations and economic difficulties. The economic structure of the airline industry may contribute to airline bankruptcies as well. One major element in almost every airline bankruptcy is the rejection by the debtor of its current collective bargaining agreements with employees. After satisfying certain requirements, bankruptcy law permits courts to approve rejection of labor contracts by the debtor-employer. With this tool, airline managers reduce costs. Terms of an employee contract negotiated over years can be eliminated in months through Chapter 11. Terms of the Railway Labor Act, amended in 1936 to cover airlines, prevent most labor union work actions before, during and after an airline bankruptcy.

Continental Airlines declared bankruptcy, Chapter 11, a second time in December 1990.

Timeline 
This is a timeline of airlines who have filed for bankruptcy protection. Also see list of defunct airlines for a list of airlines which are no longer operating.

U.S. airlines bankruptcy filings

Chapter 7
This is a list of airlines that have filed for bankruptcy protection via Chapter 7 in the United States.

Chapter 11
This is a list of airlines that have filed for bankruptcy protection via Chapter 11 in the United States.

References

Bankruptcies
 
United States
bankruptcies
Lists of bankruptcies